WaveMaker is an enterprise grade Java low code platform for building software applications and platforms. WaveMaker Inc. is headquartered in Mountain View, California. For enterprises, WaveMaker is a low code platform that aims to accelerate their app development and IT modernization efforts. For ISVs, it is a consumable low code component that can sit inside their product and offer customizations.

WaveMaker Platform is a licensed software that enables organizations to run their own end-to-application platform-as-a-service (aPaaS) for building and running custom apps. It also allows developers and business users to create apps that can be extended or customized. Those apps can consume APIs, visualize data and automatically support multi-device responsive interfaces.

WaveMaker's low code platform enables organizations to deploy applications on public or private cloud infrastructure, and containers can be deployed on top of virtual machines or on bare metal. The software provides a Graphical User Interface (GUI) console to manage the IT app infrastructure and capabilities based on Docker containerization.

The solution provides features for app deployment automation, app lifecycle management, release management, deployment workflow and access rights, including:
 Apps for web, tablet, and smartphone interfaces
 Enterprise technologies like Java, Hibernate, Spring, AngularJS, JQuery
 Docker-provided APIs and CLI
 Software stack packaging, container provisioning, stack and app upgrading, replication, and fault tolerance

WaveMaker Studio 
WaveMaker RAD Platform is built around WaveMaker Studio, a WYSIWYG rapid development tool that allows computer-literate business users to compose an application using a drag-and-drop method.  WaveMaker Studio supports rapid application development (RAD) for the web, similar to what products like PowerBuilder and Lotus Notes provided for client server computing.

WaveMaker Studio allows developers to produce an application once, then auto-adjust it for a particular target platform, whether a PC, mobile phone, or tablet. Applications created using the WaveMaker Studio follow a model–view–controller architecture.

WaveMaker Studio has been downloaded more than two million times. The Studio community consists of 30,000 registered users. Applications generated by WaveMaker Studio are licensed under the Apache license.

Studio 8 was released September 25, 2015. The prior version, Studio 7, has some notable development milestones. It was based on AngularJS framework, previous Studio versions (6.7, 6.6, 6.5) use the Dojo Toolkit. Some of the features of WaveMaker Studio 7 include:
 Automatic generation of Hibernate mapping, Hibernate queries from database schema import.
 Automatic creation of Enterprise Data Widgets based on schema import. Each widget can display data from a database table as a grid or edit form. Edit form implements create, update, delete functions automatically.
 WYSIWYG Ajax development studio runs in a browser.
 Deployment to Tomcat, IBM WebSphere, Weblogic, JBoss.
 Mashup tool to assemble web applications based on SOAP, REST and RSS web services, Java Services and databases.
 Supports existing CSS, HTML and Java code.
 Deploys a standard Java .war file.

Technologies and Frameworks
WaveMaker allows users to build applications that run on "Open Systems Stack" based on the following technologies and frameworks: AngularJS, Bootstrap, NVD3, HTML, CSS, Apache Cordova, Hibernate, Spring, Spring Security, Java. The various supported integrations include:
 Databases: Oracle, MySQL, Microsoft SQL Server, PostgreSQL, IBM DB2, HSQLDB
 Authentication: LDAP, Active Directory, CAS, Custom Java Service, Database
 Version Control: Bitbucket (or Stash), GitHub, Apache Subversion
 Deployment: Amazon AWS, Microsoft Azure, WaveMaker Private Cloud (Docker containerization), IBM Web Sphere, Apache Tomcat, SpringSource tcServer, Oracle WebLogic Server, JBoss(WildFly), GlassFish
 App Stores: Google Play, Apple App Store, Windows Store

History
 WaveMaker was founded as ActiveGrid in 2003.
 In November 2007, ActiveGrid was rebranded as WaveMaker.
 WaveMaker was acquired by VMware, Inc in March 2011 but after two years VMWare terminated the support for the WaveMaker project in March 2013.
 In May 2013, Pramati Technologies acquired the assets of  WaveMaker from VMWare.
 In February 2014, WaveMaker, Inc. released WaveMaker Studio 6.7, the last version of the open source, downloadable Studio.
 In September 2014, WaveMaker, Inc. launched WaveMaker RAD Platform (with WaveMaker Studio version 7), licensed software that enabled organizations to run their own end-to-end application platform as a service (aPaaS) for building and running custom apps.

References

External links
 

JavaScript libraries
Ajax (programming)
Web frameworks
Linux integrated development environments
Java development tools
Unix programming tools
User interface builders
Java platform software
Cloud computing providers
Cloud platforms
Web applications
Rich web application frameworks
JavaScript
JavaScript web frameworks
Self-hosting software
Web development software
IOS development software
Android (operating system) development software
Mobile software programming tools